Cuttabulloo, New South Wales is  a bounded rural locality and a civil parish of Gowen County, New South Wales.

Cuttabulloo is in Warrumbungle Shire located at 31°38′54″S 149°18′04″E  on the Castlereagh River, on the opposite bank to Piambra Railway station.

The nearest town to the parish is Binnaway, New South Wales.

References

Localities in New South Wales
Geography of New South Wales
Central West (New South Wales)